Tuomo Tompuri (born June 23, 1976) is a Finnish mountain bike orienteering competitor and World Champion. He won an individual gold medal at the 2006 World MTB Orienteering Championships, and a gold medal in the relay.

References

Finnish orienteers
Male orienteers
Finnish male cyclists
Mountain bike orienteers
1976 births
Living people
Place of birth missing (living people)
Finnish mountain bikers